Friedrich Wilhelm Kücken (16 November 1810 – 3 April 1882) was a German composer and conductor. He was a very prolific composer, mainly known for light and melodious songs, although he has also written works for the stage and for orchestra.

Career
Kücken was born in Bleckede, near Lüneburg. The son of an executioner, he learned the piano as a child and played chamber music at home in a family ensemble. After moving to Schwerin he studied harmony with his brother-in-law Friedrich Lührss, and piano with Georg Rettberg, also learning flute and violin. From 1832 to 1841, Kücken lived in Berlin, studying counterpoint with Heinrich Birnbach and teaching music to the later king George V of Hanover; he was also a member of the Sing-Akademie. Leaving Berlin, he studied with Simon Sechter in Vienna (until 1843), when his popular song Ach, wie wärs möglich dann secured his being chosen court composer for Grand Duke Paul Friedrich von Mecklenburg-Schwerin.

In 1844, he went for further studies to Paris, learning instrumentation with Fromental Halévy and vocal composition with Marco Bordogni. While in Paris, he completed his opera Der Prätendent, which was premiered in Stuttgart in 1847, becoming one of his best-known works. After spending various periods in Berlin, Hamburg and Schwerin, he moved to Stuttgart in 1851, becoming second conductor at the court theatre besides Peter Josef von Lindpaintner, becoming first conductor on Lindpaintner's death in 1856, a position he held until 1861. He then retired to Schwerin where he died in 1882 aged 71.

Music
Kücken's music has as yet not been studied in any detail. His numerous light and popular songs brought him fame all over Europe and were published and reprinted in many editions. But his works also included operas, orchestral and chamber music, and choral works. Nikolai Rimsky-Korsakov viewed Kücken's work dimly as "saccharine". His most popular large-scale work was the opera Der Prätendent.

Selected works
Operas
 Die Flucht nach der Schweiz, Op. 24 (libretto, Karl Blum), 1 act (Berlin, 1839)
 Der Prätendent (lib. Carl Philipp Berger), 3 acts (Stuttgart, 21 April 1847)
 Maienzauber (lib. Gustav von Putlitz) (Schwerin, 1864)

Orchestral music
 Gebet, Op. 62
 Waldleben, Op. 79
 Nussknacker-Quadrille, Op. 85 No. 2
 Orchesterstücke, Op. 92
 Fantasie, Op. 95
 Phantasie, Op. 108
 Trauermarsch, Op. 111
 Overture, Op. 116

Songs
 single songs with opus numbers 1, 9, 10, 14, 17, 19, 20, 23, 28, 34, 42, 47, 51, 52, 55, 57, 58, 61, 80, 91, 99, 103
 Zwei Balladen, Op. 3
 Duets with opus numbers 8, 15, 21, 26, 30, 54, 87, 105
 Gesänge, Op. 18 and Op. 39
 Lieder und Duette, Op. 35
 Tscherkasisches Lied, Op. 27
 Maurisches Ständchen, Op. 31
 Gesang der Brautjungfern, Op. 37
 Mein Herz, Op. 40
 Marienlieder, Op. 50
 Der Senn, Op. 59
 Der Himmel hat eine Träne geweint, Op. 63
 Ebbe und Flut, Op. 65
 Das Wasser ist tief, Op. 68
 Schlummerlied, Op. 82
 O dolce cento, Op. 89
 Gedenke der Heimat, Op. 98
 Die Nixen, Op. 100
 Gesangstudien, Op. 112

References

External links
 
 

1810 births
1882 deaths
19th-century classical composers
19th-century German composers
19th-century German male musicians
German male classical composers
German opera composers
German Romantic composers
Male opera composers
People from Bleckede
Pupils of Fromental Halévy